Big Spring is an unincorporated community in Page County, in the U.S. state of Virginia. It is the birthplace of Dr. Charles Pepper.

References

Unincorporated communities in Virginia
Unincorporated communities in Page County, Virginia